Wenquan Township is a township in Xinghai County, Hainan Tibetan Autonomous Prefecture, in the east of Qinghai province, People's Republic of China. The township has seven village committees within it. Rain water samples have been taken at an altitude of  within the township.

References

Township-level divisions of Qinghai
Hainan Tibetan Autonomous Prefecture